Kasompe Airport  is an airport serving Chingola, a city in the Copperbelt Province in Zambia.

See also
Transport in Zambia
List of airports in Zambia

References

External links
OpenStreetMap - Chingola
Google Maps - Kasompe

Airports in Zambia
Buildings and structures in Copperbelt Province
Tourist attractions in Copperbelt Province